Abraham Isaac Rabinovitch (1889–1964) was an Australian-Russian property developer and well-respected pioneer of the Sydney Modern Orthodox Jewish community; in particular as a founder and philanthropist of Sydney's full-time Jewish educational institutions.

Biography
Rabinovitch was born in Tiraspol, Russian Empire, on 5 November 1889. He married his first cousin, Chaya Gitman, in about 1910; immigrated via Harbin to Australia in about 1915; and after initially trying to make a living in Brisbane, Queensland, they moved to Sydney in 1921 and became naturalised Australians. Rabinovitch and his wife remained childless despite several miscarriages.

He was supportive of the Sydney Jewish community, founding two large educational institutions, the Yeshiva Centre and Moriah College. He also built New South Wales' first mikvah at 117 Glenayr Avenue in Bondi.

He died in his  home on 26 July 1964 and was buried in Rookwood Cemetery. His portrait by Joseph Wolinski is held by Moriah College.

References

1889 births
1964 deaths
Australian Orthodox Jews
Australian Jews
Australian people of Moldovan-Jewish descent
Australian people of Russian-Jewish descent
Moldovan Orthodox Jews
People from Tiraspol
People from Kherson Governorate
Bessarabian Jews
Emigrants from the Russian Empire to Australia
Jews from the Russian Empire
Russian Orthodox Jews
Modern Orthodox Jews